Lophocampa herbini is a moth in the family Erebidae. It was described by Vincent & Laguerre in 2013. It is found in Bolivia (Santa Cruz, Cochabamba) and Peru (Cuzco).

Description
The forewings are brown, irrorated with pale or deep brown. One whitish spot with one yellow and two small black dots are found at the base. There is also a series of bands formed by whitish spots and organized as follows: a broken antemedial band, a slightly curved medial band, and a sinuous postmedial band. The hindwings are whitish and slightly tinged with grey on the apex and along the costa. The ventral pattern is more contrasting, deep brown centered with yellowish-brown.

Etymology
The species is named in honor of Daniel Herbin, specialist of Saturniidae.

References

Lophocampa herbini at funet
Lophocampa herbini at BOLD Systems

Moths described in 2013
herbini